The Kitchen is a 2019 American crime film written and directed by Andrea Berloff in her directorial debut. It is based on the DC/Vertigo Comics limited series of the same name by Ollie Masters and Ming Doyle. The film stars Melissa McCarthy, Tiffany Haddish, and Elisabeth Moss as the wives of Irish American mobsters who take over organized crime operations in New York's Hell's Kitchen in the late 1970s, after the FBI arrests their husbands. The film also features Domhnall Gleeson, James Badge Dale, Brian d'Arcy James, Jeremy Bobb, Margo Martindale, Common, and Bill Camp in supporting roles.

Produced by New Line Cinema, Bron Creative, and Michael De Luca Productions, the film was theatrically released in the United States on August 9, 2019, by Warner Bros. Pictures. It received mostly negative reviews from critics, who criticized the convoluted plot, and grossed $16 million against its $38 million budget, making the film a box-office bomb.

Plot
In Hell's Kitchen 1978, three women are married to members of the O'Carroll crime family. Kathy is married to Jimmy, a kind man who is increasingly disillusioned with the mob; Ruby is married to Kevin, the son of boss Helen O'Carroll; and Claire is married to Rob, who frequently beats and abuses her.

One night, the men are arrested in a sting by FBI agents and are each sentenced to three years in prison. Jack "Little Jackie" Quinn assumes Kevin's role in the family and assures the wives that they'll be cared for, but provides them barely enough to live on. When the women discover that many of the businesses that pay the family protection money are upset with Little Jackie forcing them to pay more, they persuade the owners to start paying them instead and provide other favors for their neighbors, making a profit and earning the respect of the community. Jackie finds out and confronts the women, but is subsequently assassinated by Gabriel O'Malley, a disgraced Irish mob enforcer called in by Ruby. With Jackie out of the way and Gabriel backing them up, the women effectively control the family, while Gabriel and Claire begin a relationship.

After successfully "persuading" the local Jewish community to only hire Irish American Union workers to construct their buildings, the women are ordered to meet with Alfonso Coretti, the head of Brooklyn's Italian Mafia who is furious with Irish Americans encroaching on his territory. He insists that they start dealing with him and reveals that their husbands are set to be released in four months, which they hadn't realized. Knowing that they are in a precarious position, Coretti says he'll support them and split control of the city in return for Italian Americans getting construction jobs in Hell's Kitchen. The women agree knowing they have no other choice. Ruby subsequently kills Helen in a rage when she learns that her mother-in-law disapproves of her being married to Kevin and would almost certainly force him to divorce her when he returns.

Four months pass and the husbands are released; Kevin is determined to reassert his power as Helen's heir, Jimmy pressures Kathy to help him leave their life of crime and start over, and Rob is furious that Claire has left him for Gabriel. When Rob strikes Claire for refusing to take him back, she pulls a gun from under her pillow and kills him. Coretti then contacts the women and warns them that Kevin, backed by other members of the family, has ordered them to be whacked for the deaths of Helen and Rob. Ruby then pays the Coretti family to have her husband and his friends murdered, but Kathy makes her drop Colin, whom she is fond of, from the list. The hit goes through, but Claire is then killed by Colin in an act of revenge.

After Claire's funeral, Kathy realizes that Ruby has been secretly keeping an FBI agent on the family's payroll. Ruby explains that she set up their husbands to be arrested, as Kevin refused to let her have a role in the family. Kathy later finds that Jimmy is being sheltered by the Coretti family and taken their children with him out of anger for Kathy not respecting his wishes and not treating him as an equal in their relationship. Feeling betrayed, Kathy informs Coretti that her husband no longer has the family's protection, and Jimmy is whacked.

Ruby asks Kathy to meet her so they can discuss what to do next. When Kathy arrives, she finds that Ruby is waiting with Gabriel to kill her so she can take over as sole boss. Having anticipated this, Kathy reconciles with the O'Carroll family and brings all of their muscle as backup to the meeting. Gabriel admits that with Claire dead, he no longer has any ties to the mob and deserts Ruby. Kathy tells Ruby that from now on, they will share the responsibility of leading the family. The film ends with Kathy and Ruby making plans to expand their territory to Uptown.

Cast

Production

In February 2017, Andrea Berloff signed on to direct an adaptation of The Kitchen, a Vertigo comic book miniseries by Ollie Masters and Ming Doyle. Berloff had already been commissioned to write the screenplay for the film, but she impressed executives at New Line Cinema, the film's production company, with her "edgy and subversive" perspective. The film is her directorial debut.

In November 2017, Tiffany Haddish, off of a breakthrough performance in Girls Trip, signed on as one of the film's three female leads. In February 2018, Melissa McCarthy came on board for another lead role, and in March 2018, Elisabeth Moss was cast as the last of the three leads, while Margo Martindale, Bill Camp, and Brian d'Arcy James were also added. In April 2018, Domhnall Gleeson, Common, James Badge Dale, Jeremy Bobb, and Alicia Coppola joined the cast, and in May 2018, James Ciccone was added as well. Coppola did not appear in the finished film.

Principal photography began on May 7, 2018, in New York City, and wrapped in September 2018.

Release
The Kitchen was released on August 9, 2019, by Warner Bros. Pictures.

Reception

Box office
In the United States and Canada, The Kitchen was released alongside Dora and the Lost City of Gold, The Art of Racing in the Rain, Scary Stories to Tell in the Dark and Brian Banks, and was projected to gross $9–14 million in its opening weekend. Playing at 2,742 theaters, it was the smallest wide release of McCarthy's career. After making $1.8 million on its first day, estimates were lowered to $5–6 million. The film ended up debuting to $5.5 million, the worst opening weekend of both McCarthy and Haddish's careers. The film dropped 60% in its second weekend to $2.2 million before being pulled from 2,125 theaters in its third weekend and making just $342,506. The Hollywood Reporter estimated the film would lose "tens of millions" for the studio, although noted it could find success in home media.

Critical response
The site's critical consensus reads, "With three talented leads struggling to prop up a sagging story, The Kitchen is a jumbled crime thriller in urgent need of some heavy-duty renovation." On Metacritic the film has a weighted average score of 35 out of 100, based on 42 critics, indicating "generally unfavorable reviews." Audiences polled by CinemaScore gave the film an average grade of "B−" on an A+ to F scale.

Varietys Owen Gleiberman described the film as "just like Widows, except not as good." Gleiberman was critical of the script but praised McCarthy's fierce performance, wished Tiffany Haddish had more to do, and that Margo Martindale had a bigger role. Ty Burr of The Boston Globe wrote, "There's only one Scorsese, and he ain't here."

Mick LaSalle of the San Francisco Chronicle wrote: "Speaking of female gangsters, no review of The Kitchen should overlook Margo Martindale, who steals every scene she's in as a mob matriarch – a gravelly voiced monster with a gutter mouth and a big photo of John F. Kennedy on her wall. Martindale gets to be evil and has as much fun onscreen as she can without smiling."

References

External links
 
 
 

2019 films
2019 crime films
2019 directorial debut films
2010s American films
2010s English-language films
2010s female buddy films
American crime films
American female buddy films
Films about the American Mafia
Films about the Irish Mob
Films based on American comics
Films based on Vertigo Comics titles
Films produced by Michael De Luca
Films set in 1978
Films set in Brooklyn
Films set in Manhattan
Films shot in New York City
Films with screenplays by Andrea Berloff
Hell's Kitchen, Manhattan
Live-action films based on comics
Mariticide in fiction
New Line Cinema films
Warner Bros. films